Laing may refer to:

People 

Laing (surname), a Scottish surname

Companies
Arriva UK Trains, a British transport company formerly known as Laing Rail
John Laing Group, a British construction company
Laing O'Rourke, a British construction company, formerly part of the John Laing Group
MTR Laing, former name of London Overground Rail Operations

Places
Laing, West Virginia
Laing Art Gallery, Newcastle upon Tyne, England
Laing Dam, South Africa
Laing Middle School, South Carolina
Laing's Nek, a South African mountain pass
Battle of Laing's Nek, a Boer War battle at the pass
Mount Laing, British Columbia

Other uses
Laing (band), a German girl group
Laing (food), a Philippine dish made from taro leaves and coconut milk
Philip Laing, 19th century ship
Laing, a brand of water pump made by Goulds Water Technology aka Laing Thermotech, a subsidiary of Xylem Inc., a spin-off of ITT Inc.

See also
Lang (disambiguation)
Laings
Lange (disambiguation)
Laingsburg (disambiguation)